Melanthera (common name: squarestem), is a genus of perennial flowering plants in the family Asteraceae, native to North and South America, as well as Africa, Asia and Oceania, including Hawaii.

The most common species of this genus is Melanthera biflora, found in the coastal areas and islands of the tropical belt of the Indo-Pacific region. Together with Portulaca oleracea, Ipomoea pes-caprae and Digitaria ciliaris, Melanthera biflora is usually one of the first species colonizing degraded or altered environments in tropical zones of the planet.

Despite their general hardiness, leaves of Melanthera species are often attacked by rusts such as Uromyces columbianus and Uromyces martinii.

Taxonomy
There are difficulties regarding the classification of this genus for its affinities are uncertain. Further studies are needed to clarify its taxonomic and phylogenetic relationships.

Species
This is a list of species.
 Melanthera abyssinica (Sch.Bip. ex A.Rich.) Vatke - tropical Africa from Ethiopia to Tanzania + Sierra Leone
 Melanthera angustifolia A.Rich. - Central America, Cuba, Yucatán, Bahamas, southern Florida
 Melanthera biflora (L.) Wild. Indo-Pacific
 Melanthera bryanii (Sherff) W.L.Wagner & H.Rob. – Pili Nehe; Hawaii
 Melanthera buchii Urb. - Haiti
 Melanthera cinerea Schweinf. ex Schweinf. - Africa
 Melanthera discoidea S.F.Blake - Amazonas State in Brazil
 Melanthera elliptica O.Hoffm. - central Africa
 Melanthera fauriei (H. Lév.) W.L.Wagner & H.Rob. – Olokele Canyon Nehe; Hawaii
 Melanthera felicis C.D.Adams - Guinea in West Africa
 Melanthera gambica Hutch. & Dalziel - Gambia, Senegal, Guinea-Bissau in West Africa
 Melanthera hastata (Walt.) Rich. - Michoacán in Mexico, Islas de la Bahía in Honduras, Bahamas, El Salvador
 Melanthera integrifolia (Nutt.) W.L.Wagner & H.Rob. – Kure Atoll Nehe; Hawaii
 Melanthera kamolensis (O.Deg.) & Sherff) W.L.Wagner & H.Rob. – Maui Nehe; Maui
 Melanthera latifolia (Gardner) Cabrera - Brazil, Bolivia, Paraguay, Uruguay, Argentina
 Melanthera lavarum (Gaudich.) W.L. Wagner & H.Rob. – Coastal Nehe; Hawaii.
 Melanthera micrantha (Nutt.) W.L.Wagner & H.Rob. - Hawaii
 Melanthera nivea (L.) Small – Pineland Squarestem, Snow Squarestem, Yerba de Cabra; SE United States (LA MS AL GA FL SC TN KY IL), Caribbean, Mexico (from Tamaulipas to Quintana Roo), Central America, South America (Colombia, Venezuela, Ecuador, Guianas, northern Brazil)
 Melanthera parvifolia Small – Small-leaf Squarestem - southern Florida 
 Melanthera perdita (Sherff) W.L.Wagner & H.Rob. – Kookoolau; Hawaii
 Melanthera populifolia (Sherff) W.L. Wagner & H.Rob. – Grassland Nehe; Hawaii	 
 Melanthera prostrata (Hemsl.) W.L.Wagner & H.Rob. - China, Japan, Korea, Thailand, Vietnam
 Melanthera pungens Oliv. & Hiern - tropical Africa
 Melanthera remyi (A.Gray) W.L.Wagner & H.Rob. – Annual Nehe; Hawaii 
 Melanthera scandens (Schumach.) Roberty
 Melanthera rhombifolia O.Hoffm. & Muschl. - West Africa
 Melanthera richardsae Wild - tropical Africa
 Melanthera robinsonii Wild - tropical Africa
 Melanthera robusta (Makino) K.Ohashi & H.Ohashi - Japan, Taiwan
 Melanthera scaberrima Hiern - Angola
 Melanthera scandens (Schumach. & Thonn.) Roberty - tropical Africa
 Melanthera subcordata (A.Gray) W.L.Wagner & H.Rob. - Hawaii 
 Melanthera tenuifolia (A.Gray) W.L.Wagner & H.Rob. – Waianae Range Nehe; Oahu
 Melanthera tenuis (O.Deg. & Sherff) W.L.Wagner & H.Rob. – Streambed Nehe; Hawaii
 Melanthera triternata (Klatt) Wild - southern Africa
 Melanthera venosa (Sherff) W.L. Wagner & H.Rob. – Spreading Nehe; Hawaii
 Melanthera waimeaensis (H.St.John) W.L. Wagner & H.Rob. – Waimea Canyon Nehe; Kauai

References

External links
 
 

 
Asteraceae genera